is a yaoi manga by Makoto Tateno and published by Ohzora Publishing. It has been published in English by Aurora Publishing and in German by Egmont Manga & Anime.

Reception
Adrienne Hess found both male characters in Hate to Love You stereotypical, but enjoyed the portrayal of Akiko, a "female love interest" of Yuma, as the couple's "cupid". She found the second story to be "slightly disturbing". Hess praised the artwork, especially the expressive faces. Katja Bürk, writing for animePRO, describes the manga as "Strong feelings can change and so there can easily be love from hate, or vice versa." Brigid Alverson feels that there is little similarity to Romeo and Juliet despite the feud between the families, and found Akiko, who unites the two families to be the "most likable" character. Alverson found the other story in the volume "rather creepy".  Alverson found Tateno's art 'rather flat' yet 'dynamic' in places.

References

External links

Yaoi anime and manga
2001 manga
Manga anthologies
Aurora Publishing (United States)
Ohzora Publishing manga